Fazeley is an industrial town and civil parish in the Lichfield District in Staffordshire, England.  Fazeley is located on the outskirts of Tamworth and the civil parish of Fazeley also includes Mile Oak and Bonehill. Fazeley forms part of the Tamworth Built-up area.

It sits astride the junction of the Birmingham and Fazeley Canal and Coventry Canal; at Fazeley Junction are a couple of multi storey mills. Fazeley is also adjacent to Drayton Manor, formerly the home of Robert Peel and now a theme park and zoo.

History

The name Fazeley in its various spellings is found in documents dating back to 1135.  All suggestions concerning its derivation propose that it comes from early Saxon language most take its meaning to be pasture land or pleasant pasture but another authority suggests it is a corruption of the Anglo-Saxon faresleia which meant bulls pasture.  The various spellings support this latter suggestion and certainly the land alongside the River Tame, being very flat, may well have been used for this purpose.

Sitting in the centre of the town, Fazeley Town Hall was originally named the Victoria Memorial Hall, commemorating the diamond jubilee of Queen Victoria, and James Eadie paid for both the cost of its construction, £3,000, and the land on which it stands: it was completed in 1898.

James Eadie intended that the Hall should benefit the inhabitants of Fazeley and help to promote their welfare.  His vision was that the Hall would be used for public meetings, lectures and concerts and contain reading rooms.  He even speculated that technical classes might some day be held "for the better training of workmen in their several crafts and industries."

This vision became a reality, meetings of all descriptions took place and winter entertainments were regularly well attended.  There was a library and a reading room, classes were held in gymnastics and cookery, and an Evening Continuation School in horticulture attracted over 40 youngsters.  In later years, silent movies were presented here, too.

The First Annual Fazeley Festival and Mile Oak Mile Charity hop took place on 15 September 2007.

Transport
Fazeley sits astride the old Roman road of Watling Street, which is now much quieter following the move of the A5 road to run on a new course between Fazeley and Tamworth.

Until 1904, Wilnecote Station in nearby Two Gates was known as Wilnecote and Fazeley.

Governance

Fazeley Town Council

Fazeley Town Council consists of eleven elected councillors.  Of the eleven councillors, eight are from the Conservative Party and three from the Labour Party.  In May 2012, at 21 years of age, Councillor Rebecca James became the youngest person ever to hold the post of The Worshipful The Mayor of Fazeley and was Fazeley Town Council's youngest councillor at 18 years of age when she was elected in January 2009.

The current Mayor of Fazeley is Cllr Brian Hoult.

Fazeley Town Hall is used for both public and private events including, bingo, dancing, parties and carpet sales and Fazeley Town Council holds its meetings in the building.

Local authority
Despite bordering the District of Tamworth, Fazeley is part of the Lichfield District, of which Barry Gwilt and James Parton-Hughes are the elected representatives. Fazeley is also covered by Staffordshire County Council, with Alan White representing the area.

Education
Fazeley has two primary schools, Millfield County Primary School and Longwood Primary School, in Mile Oak.  Millfield was built in Victorian times and part of the original building still remains.

See also
Listed buildings in Tamworth, Staffordshire

References

External links
 Fazeley Town Council
 Fazeley.info

Towns in Staffordshire
Civil parishes in Staffordshire